The Kwataboahegan Formation is a geologic formation in the Moose River and Hudson Bay basins in northern Ontario, containing fossils from the Lower to Middle Devonian period. It is characterized by brown bituminous stromatoporoid-coral floatstone to bindstone and stromatoporoid-coral-crinoid wackestone-packstone-rudstones, interbedded with light grey, bioclastic wackestone-packstone.

See also

 List of fossiliferous stratigraphic units in Ontario

References

Devonian Ontario
Devonian southern paleotemperate deposits